Tsai Wen-yee is a Taiwanese weightlifter. He won a Bronze medal in the 60 kg class at the 1984 Summer Olympics in Los Angeles.

References 

1956 births
Living people
Olympic weightlifters of Taiwan
Weightlifters at the 1984 Summer Olympics
Weightlifters at the 1988 Summer Olympics
Olympic bronze medalists for Taiwan
Olympic medalists in weightlifting
Medalists at the 1984 Summer Olympics
Taiwanese male weightlifters
20th-century Taiwanese people